Samuel Birdsall (May 14, 1791 – February 8, 1872) was an American lawyer and politician who served one term as a U.S. Representative from New York from 1837 to 1839.

Biography
Born in Hillsdale, New York, Birdsall attended the common schools and studied law in the office of Martin Van Buren. He was admitted to the bar in 1812 and commenced practice in Cooperstown, New York.

He married Ann Eliza Kendig and they had three children, Elizabeth Lucinda, Franklin Samuel, and Walter.

Birdsall served as a master in chancery in 1815 and moved to Waterloo, New York in 1817. In 1819 he was commissioned Judge Advocate of the New York Militia's 21st Division with the rank of colonel.  He was counselor in the supreme court and solicitor in chancery in 1823. He served as surrogate court judge of Seneca County from 1827 to 1837 and was a state bank commissioner in 1832.

Tenure in Congress 
Elected as a Democrat to the Twenty-fifth Congress, Birdsall was United States Representative for the twenty-fifth district of New York from March 4, 1837, to March 3, 1839.

Later career
Not a candidate for renomination in 1838, Birdsall was admitted to practice before the United States Supreme Court in 1838; and served as district attorney of Seneca County in 1846. He was Postmaster of Waterloo, New York from 1853 to 1863.

Death
Birdsall died in Waterloo on February 8, 1872 (age 80 years, 270 days). He is interred at Maple Grove Cemetery in Waterloo.

References

External links

1791 births
1872 deaths
United States Army officers
Democratic Party members of the United States House of Representatives from New York (state)
New York (state) state court judges
New York (state) postmasters
People from Hillsdale, New York
People from Cooperstown, New York
People from Waterloo, New York
19th-century American politicians
19th-century American judges